Tetrapteryx may refer to:

Tetrapteryx capensis, junior synonym of Anthropoides paradiseus, the blue crane
The Tetrapteryx stage, a theoretical stage in the evolution of bird flight proposed by William Beebe